Maghāriya were a minor Jewish sect that appeared in the first century BC, their special practice was the keeping of all their literature in caves in the surrounding hills in Palestine. The Maghāriya believed that God is too sublime to mingle with matter, thus they did not believe that God directly created the world, but that an angel, which represents God created the earth (see demiurge and Ptahil). They made their own commentaries on the Bible and the law. Some scholars have identified the Maghāriya as part of the Essenes or the Therapeutae.

Other minor Jewish sects include the Bana'im and the Hemerobaptists.

References 

Apocalyptic groups
Esoteric schools of thought
Ascetics
Jewish asceticism
Jewish religious movements
Judaism-related controversies
Messianism
Mandaeism
Mandaeans
Israelites
Extinct religious groups